The following basketball players played with the Kentucky Colonels of the American Basketball Association from the team's founding in 1967 until the ABA-NBA merger in 1976.

 Henry Akin
 Dan Anderson
 Bird Averitt
 Jimmie Baker
 Howard Bayne
 Orbie Bowling
 Bill Bradley
 Jim Bradley
 Jim Caldwell
 M. L. Carr
 Darel Carrier
 Bill Chamberlain
 Wayne Chapman
 Steve Chubin
 Larry Conley
 Jimmy Dan Conner
 Bobby Croft
 Louie Dampier
 Ollie Darden
 Penny Ann Early
 John Fairchild
 David Gaines
 Mike Gale
 Artis Gilmore
 Travis Grant
 Tom Hagan
 Dennis Hamilton
 Joe Hamilton
 Dan Hester
 Les Hunter
 Dan Issel
 Billy James
 Stew Johnson
 Caldwell Jones
 Collis Jones
 Johnny Jones
 Wil Jones
 Kevin Joyce
 Ron King
 Tommy Kron
 Reggie Lacefield
 Wendell Ladner
 Manny Leaks
 Jim Ligon
 Sam Little
 Gene Littles
 Paul Long
 Maurice Lucas
 Randolph Mahaffey
 Ted McClain
 Jim McDaniels
 Eldon McGriff
 Gene Moore
 Rick Mount
 Allen Murphy
 Cotton Nash
 Johnny Neumann
 Jim O'Brien
 Bud Olsen
 Tom Owens
 Cincy Powell
 Mike Pratt
 Bobby Rascoe
 Kendall Rhine
 Red Robbins
 Joe Roberts
 Marv Roberts
 John Roche
 Pierre Russell
 Rubin Russell
 Walt Simon
 Sam Smith
 George Sutor
 Keith Swagerty
 Ron Thomas
 George Tinsley
 Jan van Breda Kolff
 Claude Virden
 Bobby Washington
 Al Williams
 Chuck Williams
 Gene Williams
 Tommy Woods
 Howie Wright

American Basketball Association lists
 
Kentucky Colonels players